Hibbertia atrichosepala is a species of flowering plant in the family Dilleniaceae and is endemic to a restricted area in the south-west of Western Australia. It is an upright shrub with crowded linear to tapering leaves and yellow flowers arranged singly in leaf axils with glabrous sepals and the five stamens all on one side of the two carpels.

Description
The five stamens are all on one side of the two carpels and are joined at the base. The carpels are densely hairy and there are two ovules per carpel. Flowering has been recorded from September to November and in April.

Taxonomy
Hibbertia atrichosepala was first formally described in 2009  by Juliet Wege and Kevin Thiele in the journal Nuytsia from specimens collected on the Ravensthorpe Range in 2008. The specific epithet (atrichosepala) means "hairless sepals".

Distribution and habitat
This species is only known from rocky hill slopes near Ravensthorpe in the south-west of Western Australia.

Conservation status
Hibbertia atrichosepala is classified as "Priority One" by the Government of Western Australia Department of Parks and Wildlife, meaning that it is known from only one or a few locations where it is potentially at risk.

See also
List of Hibbertia species

References

atrichosepala
Flora of Western Australia
Plants described in 2009
Taxa named by Kevin Thiele